The African Journal of Aquatic Science is a peer-reviewed scientific journal covering research in the aquatic sciences in Africa. It was established in 1975 as Journal of the Limnological Society of Southern Africa and renamed in 1989 as the Southern African Journal of Aquatic Sciences, before obtaining its current name in 2000. It is published by  Taylor & Francis on behalf of the Southern African Society of Aquatic Scientists.

Abstracting and indexing
The journal is abstracted and indexed in:
BIOSIS Previews
Science Citation Index Expanded
Scopus
The Zoological Record
According to the Journal Citation Reports, the journal has a 2019 impact factor of 0.778.

References

External links 

Ecology journals
Taylor & Francis academic journals
Triannual journals
Publications established in 1975
English-language journals
Marine biology